Sir Ernest Bickham Sweet-Escott  (20 August 1857 –  9 April 1941) was a British colonial administrator who was in turn governor of the British Seychelles, British Honduras, British Leeward Islands and British Fiji.

Early years
Sweet-Escott was born at Bath, the fifth son of the Rev. Hay Sweet-Escott, headmaster of Somersetshire College, Bath, and Rector of Kilve, Somerset, by his wife Eliza, daughter of Rev. John Coombes Collins, Vicar of St John's Bridgwater. He was educated at the Royal Somersetshire College, Bath, Bromsgrove School and Balliol College, Oxford. From 1881 he was professor of classics at the Royal College of Mauritius.

In 1886 he became assistant colonial secretary at Mauritius and was promoted in 1889 to acting colonial secretary. His next posting was in British Honduras from May 1893 until September 1898 when he returned to take up a post as acting government clerk at the Colonial Office.

Colonial administrator
Sweet-Escott then became administrator of the Seychelles in June 1899 and then Governor of the Seychelles when the post was created from 1903 to 1904. He was knighted in 1904 and became Governor of British Honduras from 15 April 1904 to 13 August 1906. From 1906 until 1912 he was Governor of the Leeward Islands.

Sweet-Escott became Governor of Fiji on 25 July 1912 and was also High Commissioner and Consul General for the West Pacific region. During World War I a German squadron under Maximilian von Spee was a day away from Fiji. Sweet-Escott wired a message to the Australian fleet, then 2000 miles away, which the Germans intercepted and von Spee was convinced that he was heading for a trap, turned away and laughed at the "fool of a governor for giving the show away". 
Sweet-Escott's term of office ended on 10 October 1918.

Miscellaneous
Sweet-Escott instituted the Escott Shield as a rugby trophy in 1913, which was first won by the Pacific Club.

Sweet-Escott married Mary Jane Hunt on 14 December 1881 and had five children named Kathleen, Stanley Bickham, Norah Muriel, Hugh Bevil and Leslie Wingfield.

Sweet-Escott was appointed a Order of St Michael and St George in the 1895 Birthday Honours, and a Knight Companion of the Order in the 1904 Birthday Honours.

References 

|-

1857 births
1941 deaths
Alumni of Balliol College, Oxford
Colonial Administrative Service officers
Governors of British Seychelles
Governors of British Honduras
Governors of the Leeward Islands
Governors of Fiji
Members of the Legislative Council of Fiji
Knights Commander of the Order of St Michael and St George
People educated at Bromsgrove School
British expatriate academics
People from Bath, Somerset
High Commissioners for the Western Pacific
Academic staff of the University of Mauritius